Six Mile High (or 6 Mile High) were a Western Australian rock band originally named, Yummy Fur. Formed in Perth in 1991 by Travis Calley on keyboards, programming and saxophone, Kiriakos Lucas on guitar, and Julian Ralls on guitar, together with the three Mazandarani brothers, Andrei on vocals and programming, Anton on drums and percussion, and Jerome on bass guitar. They changed their name when they signed with Sony and then relocated to Melbourne.

In 1996 they left Sony, went back to being Yummy Fur and released an album, One of These Things Is not Like the Other, in the following year. Two of Six Mile High's singles, "Homebaker" and "Hallowed Ground", were engineered by Chris Dickie, who earned a nomination for Engineer of the Year at the ARIA Music Awards of 1996 for these and "Restoration" by Header. The group disbanded in 1998.

Members 

 Travis Calley (keyboards, programming, saxophone)
 Kiriakos Lucas (guitar)
 Andrei Mazandarani (vocals, programming)
 Anton Mazandarani (drums, percussion)
 Jerome Mazandarani (bass)
 Julian Ralls (guitar)

Discography

Six Mile High

Yummy Fur
 Fir'ther EP (1993) – Salmonberry Records
 Initiations (1994)
 One Of These Things Is Not Like The Other (1997) – Offworld Sounds

References

Western Australian musical groups